Stephanie Faulkner (born 11 May 1969) is an Australian former professional tennis player.

Faulkner, a Queenslander, won national championships in junior age groups and played on the professional tour during the late 1980s. At the 1985 Auckland Open she had an upset win over the top seeded Belinda Cordwell ​to reach the quarter-finals. She made the main draw of the 1988 Australian Open and lost in the first round to Zina Garrison.

ITF finals

Singles: 3 (0–3)

References

External links
 
 

1969 births
Living people
Australian female tennis players
Tennis people from Queensland
20th-century Australian women